Haunted Tales for Wicked Kids (Portuguese: Historietas Assombradas), or Haunted Tales, is a Brazilian animated television series produced by Cartoon Network Brazil. Since its debut the series was the most watched animated series on the channel, surpassing even the original productions channel. It was based on a short film of the same name created by Victor-Hugo Borges in 2009. 40 episodes were produced.

The series chronicles the adventures of Pepe and his friends in a dark world filled with sinister creatures and monsters. It is expected to debut worldwide after being acquired by 9 Story Entertainment for distribution. It has also been broadcast on other channels (Tooncast and Cartoon Network in Latin America).

In 2017, Copa Studio and Glaz Entretenimento presented a film adaptation based on the show that released in cinemas "Historietas Assombradas: O Filme" (lit. Haunted Tales: The Movie).

Plot 
The series revolves around the adventures of Pepe, a wicked boy who lives in a dark mansion with his grandmother, a witch who works selling artifacts and magic potions on the internet. She always send her grandson to deliver them. Each episode Pepe and his friends (Marilu, Roberto, Guto and Gastón) undergo supernatural adventures facing various monsters in the city.

Characters

Main 
 Peperoni Von "Pepe" Kittenberg III (voiced by Charles Emmanuel) - A troublemaker and rude boy with spiky red hair who works as a delivery boy for his grandmother. He is always getting into mischief and causing problems, facing all the monsters and mythical beings that appear in his town, almost always through his fault. Pepe's friends are Marilu, Guto, Gastón and Roberto who often follow in the supernatural adventures.
 Ramona Bravaria de Lemornio "Grandmother" Peperonito (voiced by Nádia Carvalho) - Pepe's grandmother with whom he lives in his dark mansion. She is a wicked old witch who lives experimenting with their cats and sells potions using his grandson as a delivery boy. In one episode it is revealed that she is the older sister of Lady Death.
 Maria Lourdes "Marilu" da Silva (voiced by Iara Riça) - Pepe's best friend and partner. She assists Pepe in his supernatural adventures, often getting the group into more trouble before saving the day. She has a crush on Pepe and Mario.
 Guterico "Guto" Flores and Gaston de la Fleur (voiced by Oberdan Junior and Luis Sérgio Vieira) - Conjoined twin brothers who have two heads together on the same body. Guto tends to be nicer while Gaston is mean and rude.
 Beto "Roberto" Massa (voiced by Charles Emmanuel and Rodrigo Antas) - A tall, muscular boy. He studies in the same room with Pepe and his friends despite being slightly larger than them. He is always dressed in a varsity jacket and has a quiff.

Recurring 
 Mario (voiced by Luis Sérgio Vieira) - Pepe's archenemy, despite not being considered by that name. He is the richest boy in the class and is active, educated and kind, pretty much the opposite of Pepe.
 Ramirez - Pepe's pet dog. Ramirez lives with Pepe and Grandma in the mansion, sometimes coming to be of aid to Pepe. Ramirez is black with a white face that resembles the members of the band Kiss.

Monsters 
 Bhutumu - A gargantuan monster who appeared during the final episode of the first season. He's said to be the one who will bring the apocalypse to the earth, however it was only a bedtime story Grandmother told her grandson, teaching him that he should finish anything he started. Bhutumu is based on Cthulhu.

Episodes

Pilot

Season 1 (2013)

Season 2 (2015)

References

2010s Brazilian animated television series
2010s black comedy television series
Brazilian children's animated adventure television series
Brazilian children's animated comedy television series
Brazilian children's animated horror television series
Brazilian flash animated television series
Portuguese-language television shows
Animated television series about children
Animated television series about monsters